Istiblennius zebra, the zebra blenny, is a species of combtooth blenny found in tide pools around the Hawaiian Islands. It is also commonly known as the zebra rockskipper, rockskipper, jumping jack or the gori. It can be found in the aquarium trade.

References

zebra
Fish described in 1875